The killing of Louise Jensen happened on 16 September 1994 in Ayia Napa, Cyprus, when British soldiers Allan Ford, Justin Fowler, and Geoffrey Pernell attacked, abducted, raped, and killed Danish tour guide Louise Jensen.

Jensen 
Louise Jensen was born on 19 March 1971. She grew up in the town of Hirtshals, Denmark, together with her parents and her younger brother. After college, Jensen was working as a tour guide in Cyprus for the Danish travel agency Star Tours.

Ford, Fowler, and Pernell

Ford 
Allan Ford, nicknamed "the Cube", was born in 1968. He is from Sutton Coldfield in Birmingham. Ford was a member of The First Battalion of The Royal Green Jackets.

Ford's ex-wife has told that he had threatened her with a razor and screwdriver if she betrayed him. Nevertheless, he had cheated on her twice and taunted her about his other women. After they split, Ford told her if he caught her with a man, he would slash her face. His ex-wife has described him as a "psycho".

A month prior to the killing Ford was accused of having smashed a beer glass in the head of a tourist, injuring him seriously.

Fowler 
Justin Fowler, nicknamed "Binny", was born in 1968. He is from Constantine in Falmouth, Cornwall. Fowler was a member of the 1st Battalion, Royal Green Jackets. Fowler was considered to be a poor soldier, with a record that included several disciplinary matters and fighting.

Fowler's wife petitioned for divorce when she got to know of Jensen. Subsequently, Fowler got a girlfriend from Scotland.

Pernell 
Geoffrey Pernell was born in 1971. He is from Tividale, Sandwell, in Birmingham. Pernell was a member of The First Battalion of The Royal Green Jackets.

Pernell was accused of having attacked a woman when he was stationed at the Falkland Islands.

Killing 
In the night of 16 September 1994, Jensen and her Cypriot boyfriend were riding a motorbike when they were hit by a jeep driven by the drunk soldiers Ford, Fowler, and Pernell. Having beaten Jensen's boyfriend to the ground, Pernell forced Jensen into the jeep, and the soldiers abducted her. She was then repeatedly raped and repeatedly beaten with a spade, leading to her death. Finally she was buried in a shallow grave.

Jensen's body was found several days later. Due to the soldiers' abuse and exposure to the elements, the body was in such a condition that only Jensen's silver ring identified her.

Trial and sentence 
On 27 March 1996, Ford, Fowler, and Pernell were convicted of abduction, rape, and murder and sentenced to life imprisonment. The judges described the crime as "inhumane when planned, and vulgar when exercised". In court the soldiers' only explanation was that they "wanted a woman".

On 16 April 1996, Jensen's parents received a written apology from the British Ministry of Defence on behalf of Prime Minister John Major.

In 1998, a higher court cut their sentences to 25 years. All three men were originally sentenced to life for murder, but that was reduced to 25 years for manslaughter on appeal, on the grounds that they were judged too drunk to have planned the attack.

In 2006, after spending under twelve years in custody, the soldiers were released and deported to Great Britain. Fowler was released on 18 August. Pernell was released on 21 August. Ford was released in August.

One long-term effect of this case was for the British military to declare certain tourist resorts on the island as out of bounds to military personnel.

References

Literature 
 `The spade hit her again and again..I couldn't get my eyes to look away' SQUADDIE'S CHILLING CONFESSION TO SAVAGE KILLING OF TOUR GIRL. by Jeremy Armstrong, The Mirror, 29 March 1996.
 Murder of an Innocent by Robert Fisk, The Independent, 7 April 1996.
 Jensen appeal hears call for new testimony by Jean Christou, Cyprus Mail, 16 June 1998.
 Killer soldier back in dock by Paul Thornton, Deadlinenews.co.uk, 29 June 2010.

1990s murders in Cyprus
1994 crimes in Cyprus
1994 murders in Asia
1994 murders in Europe
Kidnappings in Cyprus
Incidents of violence against women
1994 in military history
People murdered in Cyprus
Deaths by beating
1990s in Cyprus